The following is a list of military history articles by country.

A

Military history of Abkhazia
Military history of Afghanistan
Military history of Albania
Military history of Algeria
Military history of Andorra
Military history of Angola
Military history of Antigua and Barbuda
Military history of Argentina
Military history of Armenia
Military history of Australia
Military history of Austria
Military history of Azerbaijan

Back to top

B

Military history of the Bahamas
Military history of Bahrain
Military history of Bangladesh
Military history of Barbados
Military history of Belarus
Military history of Belgium
Military history of Belize
Military history of Benin
Military history of Bhutan
Military history of Bolivia
Military history of Bosnia and Herzegovina
Military history of Botswana
Military history of Brazil
Military history of Brunei
Military history of Bulgaria
Military history of Burkina Faso
Military history of Burundi

Back to top

C

Military history of Cambodia
Military history of Cameroon
Military history of Canada
Military history of Cape Verde
Military history of the Central African Republic
Military history of Chad
Military history of Chile
Military history of China
Military history of the People's Republic of China
Military history of Hong Kong
Military history of Taiwan
Military history of the Republic of China
Military history of Colombia
Military history of Comoros
Military history of the Democratic Republic of the Congo
Military history of Republic of the Congo
Military history of Costa Rica
Military history of Côte d'Ivoire
Military history of Croatia
Military history of Cuba
Military history of Cyprus
Military history of the Czech Republic

Back to top

D

Military history of Denmark
Military history of Djibouti
Military history of the Dominican Republic

Back to top

E

Military history of East Timor
Military history of Ecuador
Military history of Egypt
Military history of El Salvador
Military history of England
Military history of Equatorial Guinea
Military history of Eritrea
Military history of Estonia
Military history of Eswatini
Military history of Ethiopia

Back to top

F

Military history of Fiji
Military history of Finland
Military history of France

Back to top

G

Military history of Gabon
Military history of Gambia
Military history of Georgia
Military history of Germany
Military history of Ghana
Military history of Greece
Military history of Grenada
Military history of Guatemala
Military history of Guinea
Military history of Guinea-Bissau
Military history of Guyana

Back to top

H

Military history of Haiti
Military history of Honduras
Military history of Hungary

Back to top

I

Military history of Iceland
Military history of India
Military history of Indonesia
Military history of Iran
Military history of Iraq
Military history of Ireland
Military history of the Lordship of Ireland
Military history of the Kingdom of Ireland
Military history of Confederate Ireland
Military history of the Irish Republic
Military history of the Irish Free State
Military history of Israel
Military history of Italy

Back to top

J

Military history of Jamaica
Military history of Japan
Military history of Jordan

Back to top

K

Military history of Kazakhstan
Military history of Kenya
Military history of Kiribati
Military history of Korea
Since the division of Korea in mid-1945 after World War II, Korea has been split into two countries: North Korea and South Korea. For post-1945 Korean military history, see military history of North Korea and military history of South Korea.
Military history of Kuwait
Military history of Kyrgyzstan

Back to top

L

Military history of Laos
Military history of Latvia
Military history of Lebanon
Military history of Lesotho
Military history of Liberia
Military history of Libya
Military history of Liechtenstein
Military history of Lithuania
Military history of Luxembourg

Back to top

M

Military history of Macedonia
Military history of Madagascar
Military history of Malawi
Military history of Malaysia
Military history of the Maldives
Military history of Mali
Military history of Malta
Military history of the Marshall Islands
Military history of Mauritania
Military history of Mauritius
Military history of Mexico
Military history of the Federated States of Micronesia
Military history of Moldova
Military history of Monaco
Military history of Mongolia
Military history of Morocco
Military history of Mozambique
Military history of Myanmar

Back to top

N

Military history of Nagorno-Karabakh
Military history of Namibia
Military history of Nauru
Military history of Nepal
Military history of the Netherlands
Military history of New Zealand
Military history of Nicaragua
Military history of Niger
Military history of Nigeria
Military history of Northern Cyprus
Military history of North Korea
Military history of Norway

Back to top

O

Military history of Oman

Back to top

P

Military history of Pakistan
Military history of Palau
Military history of Panama
Military history of Papua New Guinea
Military history of Paraguay
Military history of Peru
Military history of the Philippines
Military history of Poland
Military history of Portugal
Military history of Puerto Rico

Back to top

Q

Military history of Qatar

Back to top

R

Military history of the Roman Empire
Military history of RomaniaMilitary history of Russia
Military history of Rwanda

Back to top

S

Military history of Saint Kitts and Nevis
Military history of Saint Lucia
Military history of Saint Vincent and the Grenadines
Military history of Samoa
Military history of San Marino
Military history of São Tomé and Príncipe
Military history of Saudi Arabia
Military history of Scotland
Military history of Senegal
Military history of Serbia
Military history of Seychelles
Military history of Sierra Leone
Military history of Singapore
Military history of Slovakia
Military history of Slovenia
Military history of the Solomon Islands
Military history of Somalia
Military history of Somaliland
Military history of South Africa
Military history of South Ossetia
Military history of South Korea
Military history of the Soviet Union
Military history of Spain
Military history of Sri Lanka
Military history of Sudan
Military history of Suriname
Military history of Sweden
Military history of Switzerland
Military history of Syria

Back to top

T

Military history of the Republic of China (Taiwan)
Military history of Tajikistan
Military history of Tanzania
Military history of Thailand
Military history of Togo
Military history of Tonga
Military history of Transnistria
Military history of Trinidad and Tobago
Military history of Tunisia
Military history of Turkey
Military history of Turkmenistan
Military history of Tuvalu

Back to top

U

Military history of Uganda
Military history of Ukraine
Military history of the United Arab Emirates
Military history of the United Kingdom
Military history of the United Kingdom of Great Britain and Ireland
Military history of the United Kingdom
Military history of the Republic of Ireland
Military history of Northern Ireland
Military history of the United States
Military history of the Confederate States
Military history of Uruguay
Military history of Uzbekistan

Back to top

V

Military history of Vanuatu
Military history of the Vatican City
Since 1929, defense has been responsibility of Italy (see military history of Italy); for pre-1929 military history, see military history of the Papal States.
Military history of Venezuela
Military history of Vietnam

Back to top

W

Military history of Western Sahara
Military history of Wales

Back to top

Y

Military history of Yemen

Back to top

Z

Military history of Zambia
Military history of Zimbabwe

Back to top

 
History